The Forest Research Institute Malaysia (FRIM; Malay: Institut Penyelidikan Perhutanan Malaysia) is a statutory agency of the Government of Malaysia, under the Ministry of Land, Water and Natural Resources (KATS). FRIM promotes sustainable management and optimal use of forest resources in Malaysia by generating knowledge and technology through research, development and application in tropical forestry. FRIM is located in Kepong, near Kuala Lumpur.

FRIM is the world's oldest and largest re-created tropical rain forest.

History 
In 1926, the chief conservator of the forest (equivalent to today's director of forestry), G.E.S Cubitt, asked F.W. Foxworthy to establish a separate forest research unit for the Forestry Department. It was Foxworthy who selected the present site, at Kepong. He was also to become the institute's first chief research officer.

The site comprised an area that was practically stripped of its original forest cover except for a few remnant trees at the more inaccessible localities. Lalang-grass scrub on the hillsides made way to vegetable terraces on the lower slopes, while the valley cradled a few ponds, the left-overs of a past tin-mining operation.

Within two years in 1928, the first  of experimental plantation (mainly dipterocarps, tall hardwood species) were in place, carefully nurtured into being using "nurse" trees of other species as shade and food providers (being nitrogen-fixers). By that time the construction of the main building had begun. Completed the following years, this building was to remain the sole centre for the laboratories, herbarium, and museum, as well as the Chemistry, Zoology and Sivilculture sections of the institute, until new buildings were added after World War II. The herbarium collection, that was also moved to Kepong, numbered 1,500 accessions.

The end of the decade saw some 125 hectares of plantation established at the institute. Plantation trials with exotic species started in the early 1930s. The plantations covered 154 hectares just before the outbreak of World War II in Europe in 1939, and before the Japanese occupation of the Malay Peninsula in 1941–1945. By this time the dipterocarp and non-Dipterocarp arboreta contained 75 species (represented by 360 individual trees), while the Herbarium collection numbered nearly 40,000 accessions.

Establishment 
Just before Malaysia won independence from the British Empire in 1957, some 220 hectares of plantations had been established at the institute, while the Dipterocarp and non-Dipterocarp arboreta held 201 and 168 species respectively. The herbarium collection had grown to 53,600 accessions. The Timber Research Branch had moved from Sentul to become a part of the institute at Kepong.

Six years later, Encik Abdul Rahman Mohd. Ali was appointed the institute's first Malaysian director and chief research officer. The ground of the institute expanded by a further 192 hectares in 1962 and 1964 to total 600 hectares.

In 1977 Dr. Salleh Mohd. Nor was appointed to the post of director general of the institute. Eight years later, the institute was transformed into a statutory body. Through an Act of Parliament, the Malaysia Forestry Research and Development Board (MFRDB) was formed to administer the institute, which was now named FOREST RESEARCH INSTITUTE of MALAYSIA (FRIM). This historic change was announced by the then Prime Minister Dr Mahathir Mohamad when he visited FRIM on 11 June 1984. The formal inauguration of FRIM took place later, on 5 April 1986.

Gallery

References

External links

 
 Official Facebook page
 Tourism Malaysia - FRIM

Federal ministries, departments and agencies of Malaysia
Malaysia
Research institutes in Malaysia
Nature sites of Selangor
Forestry in Malaysia
Research institutes established in 1926
1985 establishments in Malaysia
Government agencies established in 1985
Ministry of Energy and Natural Resources (Malaysia)
Winners of the Nikkei Asia Prize